The 2009 season of the Palau Soccer League was the sixth season of association football competition in Palau. Melekeok FC won the championship, their first title.

References

Palau Soccer League seasons
Palau
Soccer